The Roman–Greek wars were a series of conflicts between the Roman Republic and various Ancient Greek states during the late Hellenistic period. The list includes:

 the Pyrrhic War (280–275 BC), after which Rome asserted its hegemony over Magna Grecia.
 the First Macedonian War (214–205 BC), that ended with the Peace of Phoenice
 Siege of Syracuse (213-212 BC) Greek city of Syracuse in Sicily falls to the Romans
 the Second Macedonian War (200–197 BC), during which the Romans declared "the freedom of Greece" from the Macedonian Kings.
 the Roman–Seleucid War (192–188 BC), that ended with the Peace of Apamea
 the Third Macedonian War (171–168 BC), after which Macedonian territory was divided in four client republics
 the Fourth Macedonian War (150–148 BC), after which Macedonia was formally annexed
 the Achaean War (146 BC), during which Corinth was destroyed and Southern Greece divided in two provinces.
First Mithridatic War (89-85 BC), during which Rome fights with Pontus over control of Anatolia.
Second Mithridatic War (83-81BC) which ended indecisively.
Third Mithridatic war (73-63 BC) In which Rome gives the final blow and conquers the Pontic kingdom and Syria.
Siege of Massilia (49 BC) Greek city of Massilia in southern France falls to the Romans
War of Actium (32-30 BC) In which Octavian wins Mark Antony and Cleopatra conquering the Greek Kingdom of Ptolemaic Egypt.

See also
 Greco-Italian war
 Roman–Gallic wars
 Punic Wars
 Roman–Persian wars
 Nicaean–Latin wars

 
3rd-century BC conflicts
2nd-century BC conflicts
3rd century BC in the Roman Republic
2nd century BC in the Roman Republic
3rd century BC in Greece
2nd century BC in Greece
Wars involving ancient Greece
Greece
Wars of the Hellenistic period
Greece in the Roman era